Andrea Jakab (born 21 July 1981) is a Romanian speed skater. She won a bronze medal at the 1997 European Youth Olympic Winter Days (1000 m speed skating), and took seventh place at the 2001 European Speed Skating Championships (5000 m speed skating). She competed in three events at the 2002 Winter Olympics.

References

1981 births
Living people
Romanian female speed skaters
Olympic speed skaters of Romania
Speed skaters at the 2002 Winter Olympics
Sportspeople from Târgu Mureș